Dəlilər (also, Dəllər, Dallyar, and Dollyar) is a village and the least populous municipality in the Agsu Rayon of Azerbaijan.  It has a population of 86.

References 

Populated places in Agsu District